Nephele comoroana is a moth of the  family Sphingidae. It is known from the Comoro Islands.

References

Nephele (moth)
Moths described in 1923
Moths of the Comoros
Endemic fauna of the Comoros